Luis Osvaldo García (born 7 March 1988) is an Argentine football manager.

Career
After beginning his career as an under-15 manager at Nueva Chicago, García also worked at Boca Juniors' youth categories before being named assistant of Nueva Chicago in 2016. In June of that year, he was also an interim coach of the club, as manager Alejandro Nanía was unavailable.

In August 2016, García joined Gabriel Cosenza's staff at Ecuadorian side Deportivo Cuenca, as an assistant. He returned to his home country in the following year, as an assistant coach at Atlanta, and later worked for a brief period at River Plate's youth categories before being named assistant of Nanía at Barracas Central in November.

In 2018, García returned to Nueva Chicago to take over the reserve side. He left in March 2019 to join Nanía's staff at Colegiales, but was appointed manager shortly after, as Nanía was named general manager of the club. He resigned from the side after just three matches.

In August 2019, García was appointed César Farías' assistant in the Bolivia national team. He left his role in March 2022, after Farías resigned.

On 6 June 2022, García was appointed manager of Bolivian Primera División side Royal Pari, but was sacked on 28 July after just six matches.

References

External links

1988 births
Living people
Argentine football managers
Nueva Chicago managers
Argentine expatriate football managers
Argentine expatriate sportspeople in Ecuador
Argentine expatriate sportspeople in Bolivia
Expatriate football managers in Bolivia
Bolivian Primera División managers
Royal Pari F.C. managers